The Wessex Saker Light Strike Vehicle was a British Army light vehicle similar to a sandrail.
They were produced in the late 1980s for the British Special Air Service.

Design was by Wessex and Devonport Management Limited. The frame was welded tube and power, to the rear wheels only, was from a Volkswagen 1.6 litre air-cooled petrol engine.

It was a two-man vehicle which could be armed with either a 7.62 mm GMPG or a 0.5 inch M2 machine gun.

See also
Desert Patrol Vehicle/Light Strike Vehicle
Light Strike Vehicle (Singapore)

Notes and references

Military Vehicle club featured vehicles

Military vehicles of the United Kingdom
Military light utility vehicles
Special Air Service